AbiWord is a free and open-source software word processor. It is written in C++ and since version 3 it is based on GTK+ 3. The name "AbiWord" is derived from the root of the Spanish word "abierto", meaning "open".

AbiWord was originally started by SourceGear Corporation as the first part of a proposed AbiSuite but was adopted by open source developers after SourceGear changed its business focus and ceased development. It now runs on Linux, ReactOS, Solaris, AmigaOS 4.0 (through its Cygwin X11 engine), MeeGo (on the Nokia N9 smartphone), Maemo (on the Nokia N810), QNX and other operating systems. Development of a version for Microsoft Windows has ended due to lack of maintainers (the latest released versions are 2.8.6 and 2.9.4 beta ).

The macOS port has remained on version 2.4 since 2005, although the current version does run non-natively on macOS through XQuartz.

AbiWord is part of the AbiSource project which develops a number of office-related technologies. Abiword is one of the rare text processing software which allows local users to edit simultaneously a same shared document in a local network, without the requirement of an Internet connection, since 2009.

Features
AbiWord supports both basic word processing features such as lists, indents and character formats, and more sophisticated features including tables, styles, page headers and footers, footnotes, templates, multiple views, page columns, spell checking, and grammar checking. Starting with version 2.8.0, AbiWord includes a collaboration plugin that allows integration with AbiCollab.net, a Web-based service that permits multiple users to work on the same document in real time, in full synchronization. The Presentation view of AbiWord, which permits easy display of presentations created in AbiWord on "screen-sized" pages, is another feature not often found in word processors.

Interface
AbiWord generally works similarly to classic versions (pre-Office 2007) of Microsoft Word, as direct ease of migration was a high priority early goal. While many interface similarities remain, cloning the Word interface is no longer a top priority. The interface is intended to follow user interface guidelines for each respective platform.

File formats
AbiWord comes with several import and export filters providing a partial support for such formats as HTML, Microsoft Word (.doc), Office Open XML (.docx), OpenDocument Text (.odt), Rich Text Format (.rtf), and text documents (.txt). LaTeX is supported for export only. Plug-in filters are available to deal with many other formats, notably WordPerfect documents. The native file format, .abw, uses XML, so as to mitigate vendor lock-in concerns with respect to interoperability and digital archiving.

Grammar checking
The AbiWord project includes a US English-only grammar checking plugin using Link Grammar. AbiWord had grammar checking before any other open source word processor, although a grammar checker was later added to OpenOffice.org. Link Grammar is both a theory of syntax and an open source parser which is now developed by the AbiWord project.

See also

List of free and open-source software packages
List of word processors
 Comparison of word processors
 Office Open XML software
 OpenDocument software

References

External links

 
 
 Andrew Leonard: Abiword Up. Salon.com, November 15, 2002. History of the project and comparison with closed source development.
 Interview with Development team after 2.6 release
 AbiWord: A Small, Swift Word Processor

Office software that uses GTK
Free software programmed in C++
Free word processors
Linux word processors
MacOS word processors
Windows word processors
Cross-platform free software
Portable software
1998 software
Software using the GPL license